is a Japanese football player.

Playing career
Hagino was born in Aichi Prefecture on June 20, 2000. He joined J1 League club Nagoya Grampus from youth team in 2018.

References

External links

2000 births
Living people
Association football people from Aichi Prefecture
Japanese footballers
J1 League players
Nagoya Grampus players
Association football midfielders